Adisoemarmo International Airport Station (SMO) is an airport railway station located on airport complex in Ngesrep, Ngemplak, Boyolali Regency. The position of this station is on the north wing of the entrance to Adisumarmo International Airport. The station is included in the Operational Region VI Yogyakarta.

The station was opened simultaneously with the operation of the –Adisoemarmo railway segment. The Adisumarmo Airport Rail Link operates as of 29 December 2019.

Services 
The following is a list of train services at the Adisoemarmo International Airport Station.

Passenger services
Airport rail link

References

Boyolali Regency
Railway stations in Central Java
Railway stations opened in 2019
Airport railway stations in Indonesia
2019 establishments in Indonesia